The Swedish infantry musket, or the Swedish Land Pattern Musket, was a muzzle-loaded 0.63 (16.002 mm) to 0.81 (20.7mm)-inch calibre smoothbored long gun. These weapons were in service within the Royal Swedish Army from the mid-16th century until the mid-19th century.

History
At the end of the 16th century, the Swedish military musket became a style-setter. Its style remained the same until about 1660 in most armies. In Sweden, its basic style lasted for many years—until the end of the 1680s. The matchlock was the dominant mechanism on the Swedish Army soldiers' muskets as well as among other European armed forces, and remained so until the latter half of the 1600s when the snaphaunce mechanism increasingly took over. But it was not until the flintlock mechanism as well as the bayonet had taken hold in earnest—around the turn of the 17th–18th centuries—that the matchlock became completely obsolete among the various squadrons within the Swedish Empire. However, some weapons equipped with wheellock mechanism were primarily reserved for the cavalry. The Swedish, purely warlike musket design remained in its basic form from Model 1696 until Model 1775. Before that, long guns – military as well as civilian – were produced in a variety of designs.

Clear variants

Model 1673

Model 1688
Matchlock Musket M1688Snaphaunce Musket M1688'Model 1690

Model 1696
The flintlock carbine M1696 was the first bayonet-equipped.Swedish Army Museum

Model 1704

Model 1716

Model 1725

Model 1738

Model 1762Krävan with the krävan-fitting was abandoned in favour of a third scouring stick-pipe, where a ramrod (now made of iron) instead rested and a fourth scouring stick-pipe (all now in brass) next to the chamber. And the stock was equipped with a nose cap, also in brass.

Model 1775
With the manufacturing of the 1775 model, the pins holding the barrel in place were abandoned in favour of two scouring stick-pipe-bands with associated kräkor'' and a front barrel band nose cap with bow-shaped front sights in brass infused.

Model 1784

Model 1791

Model 1805

Model 1815

Model 1840

Model 1848

See also
List of wars involving Sweden
Military history of Sweden
Musket

External links
Swedish Army Museum
Forum for Living History
Swedish Ingermanland National Association (in Swedish)

References 

Muskets